Nabala is a village in Kiili Parish, Harju County, in northern Estonia, located about  southeast of Tallinn.  It has a population of 147 (as of 2009).

Estonian largest karst area (80.8 km²) is located around Nabala.

References

External links
Nabala Manor
Nabala Manor at Estonian Manors Portal

Villages in Harju County
Kreis Harrien